"Don't Need Love" is the debut single by Australian rock group Johnny Diesel and the Injectors. The song was released in October 1988 and peaked at 10 in Australia and 7 in New Zealand.

The song was nominated for two awards at the ARIA Music Awards of 1989, winning Best New Talent but losing Breakthrough Artist – Single to "That's When I Think of You" by 1927.

Track listing
7" single
 "Don't Need Love" – 4:15
 "Never Last" – 3:33

12" vinyl
 "Don't Need Love" – 4:15
 "Never Last" – 3:33
 "Parisienne Hotel"

Personnel
 Terry Manning – producer, engineer, mixing
 Johnny "Tatt" Dalzell – bass guitar
 Yak Sherrit – drums
 Johnny Diesel – guitar, vocals
 Bernie Bremond – saxophone, backing vocals

Charts
"Don't Need Love" debuted at number 36 in Australia in November 1988, before peaking at #10 in December.

Weekly charts

Year-end charts

References

Chrysalis Records singles
1988 debut singles
1988 songs
ARIA Award-winning songs
Diesel (musician) songs
Songs written by Diesel (musician)
Song recordings produced by Terry Manning